Chaturanga Dandasana (IAST: Caturaṅga Daṇḍāsana) or Four-Limbed Staff pose, also known as Low Plank, is an asana in modern yoga as exercise and in some forms of Surya Namaskar (Salute to the Sun), in which a straight body parallel to the ground is supported by the toes and palms, with elbows at a right angle along the body. The variation Kumbhakasana, Phalakasana, or High Plank has the arms straight.

Etymology and origins

The name comes from the  IAST catur, "four"; अङ्ग aṅga, "limb"; दण्ड daṇḍa, "staff"; and आसन; āsana,  "posture" or "seat".

The pose is unknown in hatha yoga until the 20th century Light on Yoga, but the pose appears in the 1896 Vyayama Dipika, a manual of gymnastics, as part of the "very old" sequence of danda exercises. Norman Sjoman suggests that it is one of the poses adopted into modern yoga in Mysore by Krishnamacharya and forming the "primary foundation" for his vinyasas with flowing movements between poses. The pose would then have been taken up by his pupils Pattabhi Jois and B. K. S. Iyengar.

Description

In Chaturanga Dandasana the hands and feet are on the floor, supporting the body, which is parallel to and lowered toward, but not touching, the floor. It looks much like a push up, but with the hands quite low (just above the pelvis), and the elbows kept in along the sides of the body.

In vinyasa styles of yoga, Chaturanga Daṇḍasana is part of the Surya Namaskar (Salute to the Sun) asana sequence, performed on an exhale. In Ashtanga vinyasa yoga's Surya Namaskar A it is the fourth asana, and in Surya Namaskar B it is the fourth, eighth and twelfth asanas.

In yoga practice without vinyasas, the posture is simply held for a period of time (for instance, 30 seconds) with continuous breathing.

Variations 

Beginners can practise with the knees on the floor, or keeping the arms straight (in Kumbhakasana, also called Phalakasana or High Plank), before attempting the full pose. High Plank too is used in some forms of the Sun Salutation.

Purvottanasana, Reverse Plank, or Upward Plank, has the back straight but the front of the body facing upwards, the arms outstretched down to the floor, the fingers pointing towards the feet.

See also 

 Dolphin Pose - a preparation for Pincha Mayurasana
 List of asanas
 Plank (exercise)
 Vasishtasana - side plank pose

References

Sources

External links 
 Step by Step Instruction

Reclining asanas
Surya Namaskar
Core strength asanas